Dallas Neal Trahern (born November 29, 1985) is a former professional baseball pitcher. He played in international competition with USA Baseball.

Trahern was drafted by the Detroit Tigers in the 34th round of the 2004 Major League Baseball Draft. He was traded along with Burke Badenhop, Eulogio De La Cruz, Cameron Maybin, Andrew Miller, and Mike Rabelo to the Florida Marlins in exchange for Miguel Cabrera and Dontrelle Willis.

He is known as a sinkerball pitcher and in 2009 had Tommy John surgery.

References

External links

1985 births
Living people
People from Liberal, Kansas
Gulf Coast Tigers players
West Michigan Whitecaps players
Lakeland Tigers players
Erie SeaWolves players
Toledo Mud Hens players
Albuquerque Isotopes players
Jupiter Hammerheads players
New Orleans Zephyrs players
Baseball players from Kansas